The Katanga Supergroup is a Neoproterozoic sequence of geological formations found in central Africa.  The formation is well-studied for its rich stratiform copper-cobalt deposits mined extensively in from the Central African Copperbelt in Zambia and the Democratic Republic of the Congo. Particularly rich outcrops of the Roan Group of the supergroup occur in eastern Katanga Province of the Democratic Republic of the Congo where open-pit copper mining has occurred.

The Katanga Supergroup nonconformably overlies the 883 Ma Nchanga Granite. The Katangan Supergroup is divided into four metasedimentary series, from the oldest siliclastic and dolomitic Roan Group conglomerates, sandstones, and shales, to Nguba Group of mostly carbonates and carbon-rich shales, to the youngest, upper most Kundelungu Group including glacial metasediments and a cap carbonate.

The Katanga Supergroup correlates with rocks of the Makuti Group in other parts of the Democratic Republic of Congo.

Mines of the Katanga Supergroup
Democratic Republic of Congo
Dikulushi Mine
Dikuluwe Mine
Etoile Mine
Frontier Mine, Katanga
Kalukundi Mine
Kalumines
Kambove mines
Kamfundwa Mine
Kamoto Mine
Kananga Mine
Kinsenda Mine
Kinsevere
Kipoi Mine
Kipushi Mine
Lonshi Mine
Luishia Mine
Luiswishi Mine
Luita
Mashamba East
Mukondo Mine
Musonoi Mine
Musoshi Mine
Mutanda Mine
Mutoshi Mine
Ruashi Mine
Sase prospect
Shituru
Tilwezembe
Zambia
Mufulira Mine
Nkana Mine
Konkola Copper Mine
Kansanshi Mine
Sentinel Mine
Luamwana Mine

References

Geologic formations of the Democratic Republic of the Congo
Geologic formations of Zambia
Neoproterozoic Africa
Copper mining in the Democratic Republic of the Congo
Copper mines in Zambia
Copperbelt Province
Mining in Katanga Province